Prince John may refer to:

John, King of England (1166–1216) known as Prince John during the reigns of his father and older brother
Prince John of the United Kingdom (1905–1919), youngest son of King George V
John of Eltham, Earl of Cornwall (1316–1336), second son of Edward II
John of Gaunt, 1st Duke of Lancaster (1340-1399), third son of Edward III
John of Lancaster, 1st Duke of Bedford (1389–1435), second son of Henry IV
Prince Alexander John of Wales (1871), third son and youngest child of Edward VII

Other 
Nickname of Confederate general John B. Magruder
Prince John (horse), champion racehorse

John